Argyropelecus gigas, the giant hatchetfish or greater silver hatchetfish, is a marine fish of the genus Argyropelecus. It is found in every ocean except the north Pacific in the mesopelagic zone of tropical and subtropical waters. "Giant" in relative terms only, this is the largest species of marine hatchetfishes, often exceeding  standard length.

References

External links
 
 

Sternoptychidae
Fish of the Dominican Republic
Fish of the Atlantic Ocean
Fish of the Indian Ocean
Fish of the Pacific Ocean
Fish described in 1930
Taxa named by John Roxborough Norman